Bouchard Lake is an L-shaped body of water covering sixteen acres in Mineral County, Montana in the United States. The lake is located five miles northwest of Superior, Montana in the valley of the Clark Fork River.

Geology
Bouchard Lake has given its name to the Bouchard Formation, a geologic unit "composed principally of interbedded micaceous quartzite and quartzose argillite that conformably overlies the Sloway formation" exposed near the lake.

References

Lakes of Montana
Bodies of water of Mineral County, Montana